Carmen Carbonell Nonell (1900–1988) was a Spanish stage and film actress. She received the National Theater Award twice, in 1950 and 1980.

Selected filmography
 Fortunato (1942)
 The Miracle of Marcelino (1955)
 The Desperate Ones (1967)

References

Bibliography 
  Eva Woods Peiró. White Gypsies: Race and Stardom in Spanish Musical Films. U of Minnesota Press, 2012.

External links 
 

1900 births
1988 deaths
Spanish film actresses